

Europe
Springbank Cemetery, Aberdeen

United States
Springbank Cemetery, Clarke County, Alabama
Springbank Cemetery, Dixon, Nebraska
Springbank Cemetery, Ross County, Ohio
Springbank Cemetery, Clay County, Florida